Relative accessible surface area or relative solvent accessibility (RSA) of a protein residue is a measure of residue solvent exposure. It can be calculated by formula:

 

where ASA is the solvent accessible surface area and MaxASA is the maximum possible solvent accessible surface area for the residue.

To measure the relative solvent accessibility of the residue side-chain only, one usually takes MaxASA values that have been obtained from Gly-X-Gly tripeptides, where X is the residue of interest. Several MaxASA scales have been published
and are commonly used (see Table).

In this table, the more recently published MaxASA values (from Tien et al. 2013) are systematically larger than the older values (from Miller et al. 1987 or Rose et al. 1985). This discrepancy can be traced back to the conformation in which the Gly-X-Gly tripeptides are evaluated to calculate MaxASA. However, Tien et al. 2013 demonstrated that tripeptides in extended conformation fall among the least-exposed conformations. Tien et al. 2013 recommend to use their theoretical MaxASA values (2nd column in Table), as they were obtained from a systematic enumeration of all possible conformations and likely represent a true upper bound to observable ASA.

ASA and hence RSA values are generally calculated from a protein structure, for example with the software DSSP. However, there is also an extensive literature attempting to predict RSA values from sequence data, using machine-learning approaches.

Prediction tools 
Experimentally predicting RSA is an expensive and time-consuming task. In recent decades, several computational methods have been introduced for RSA prediction.

References 

Molecular modelling
Protein structure